Idan Roll (born 27 April 1984) is an Israeli politician, model and lawyer who is a member of the Knesset for Yesh Atid. He served as Deputy Minister of Foreign Affairs under the administration of Yair Lapid.

Biography
Roll was born in Jerusalem and moved to Mevaseret Zion as a child, attending Harel High School. He started his national service in the Israel Defense Forces in 2002, serving in the Israeli Intelligence Corps in a technology unit in central Israel, before completing an officer course and becoming cadet commander. After completing his national service, he began serving in the reserves in the Military Intelligence Directorate.

In 2007 he started studying at Tel Aviv University law school. Whilst at university, he joined StandWithUs, and worked as a model. After graduating, he joined Meitar Liquornik Geva Leshem Tal's commercial department. He also completed a master's degree in public law, and later worked in law firms specialising in high-tech, mergers and acquisitions.

Political career
Having previously been a member of the New Likudniks faction of Likud, Roll joined the Yesh Atid party, and became head of its LGBTQ group. He was part of the Yesh Atid list for Tel Aviv-Yafo city council in the 2018 municipal elections. After the party joined the Blue and White alliance for the April 2019 Knesset elections, he was given the thirty-fourth slot on the joint list, and was subsequently elected to the Knesset as the alliance won 35 seats. Although he retained thirty-fourth place on the Blue and White list for the early elections in September 2019, the alliance was reduced to 33 seats, resulting in Roll losing his seat.

He was placed thirty-fourth on the Blue and White list for the March 2020 elections. Although the party won 33 seats, Roll entered the Knesset after Yael German (who was thirteenth on the list) retired. He was re-elected in the 2021 elections, in which Yesh Atid ran alone. He was subsequently appointed Deputy Minister of Foreign Affairs in the new government, after which he gave up his Knesset seat under the Norwegian Law. He was re-elected in the 2022 elections.

Personal life
On 5 March 2021 Roll married pop singer Harel Skaat in Provo, Utah, United States. They have two children, born via surrogacy in 2018 and in 2021 in Tulsa, Oklahoma, USA. On 7 March 2021, Skaat and Roll announced their wedding on social media, which had taken place on 5 March 2021 in Provo, Utah, USA.

References

External links

1984 births
Living people
21st-century Israeli lawyers
21st-century Israeli military personnel
Blue and White (political alliance) politicians
Deputy ministers of Israel
Gay military personnel
Gay models
Gay politicians
Israeli male models
Israeli officers
Jewish Israeli politicians
Jewish male models
LGBT Jews
LGBT lawyers
LGBT members of the Knesset
Members of the 21st Knesset (2019)
Members of the 23rd Knesset (2020–2021)
Members of the 24th Knesset (2021–2022)
Members of the 25th Knesset (2022–)
Models from Jerusalem
People of the Military Intelligence Directorate (Israel)
Politicians from Jerusalem
Tel Aviv University alumni
Yesh Atid politicians